This is a list of the number-one downloaded songs in Canada during the year 2017.

The Nielsen SoundScan-compiled chart is published on Music Canada's website on Mondays and Billboard on Tuesdays.

Note that Billboard publishes charts with an issue date approximately 10–11 days in advance.

Chart history

See also
List of Canadian Hot 100 number-one singles of 2017
List of number-one albums of 2017 (Canada)
List of number-one digital songs of 2016 (Canada)

References

External links
Billboard Hot Canadian Digital Songs
Current Hot Digital Canadian Songs

Canada Digital Songs
Digital 2017
2017 in Canadian music